{{Automatic taxobox
| name = Alcippe fulvettas
| image = Mountain Fulvetta.jpg
| image_caption = Mountain fulvetta (Alcippe peracensis)
| taxon = Alcippe
| display_parents = 2
| authority = Blyth, 1844
| subdivision_ranks = Species
| subdivision = See text 
| type_species = Alcippe poioicephala}}Alcippe is a genus of passerine birds in the monotypic family Alcippeidae. The genus once included many other fulvettas and was previously placed in families Pellorneidae or Timaliidae.

Taxonomy

The genus Alcippe previously included many of the fulvettas, but recent taxonomy has seen the group progressively redefined. The Fulvetta fulvettas are now placed in family Paradoxornithidae, the bush blackcap in the genus Sylvia in the family Sylviidae, and, in the most recent revision, a group of seven species were transferred to the new genus Schoeniparus in family Pellorneidae. With the rearrangement of the species there are now birds with the common name "fulvetta" in three families: in the genera Lioparus and Fulvetta in Paradoxornithidae, Schoeniparus in Pellorneidae, and Alcippe in Alcippeidae.

The family Alcippeidae is sister to the family Leiothrichidae containing the laughingthrushes.

The genus contains the following ten species:

References

Collar, N. J. & Robson C. 2007. Family Timaliidae (Babblers)  pp. 70 – 291 in; del Hoyo, J., Elliott, A. & Christie, D.A. eds. Handbook of the Birds of the World'', Vol. 12. Picathartes to Tits and Chickadees. Lynx Edicions, Barcelona.

Bird genera
Alcippe (bird)
Taxa named by Edward Blyth